The  NIN Award (Нинова награда), officially the Award for Best Novel of the Year, is a prestigious Serbian (and previously Yugoslavian) literary award established in 1954 by the NIN weekly and is given annually for the best newly published novel written in Serbian (previously in Serbo-Croatian). The award is presented every year in January by a panel of writers and critics. In addition to being a highly acclaimed award capable of transforming writers' literary careers, the award is also sought after because it virtually assures bestseller status for the winning novel. The literary website complete review called it the "leading Serbian literary prize" in 2012. 

Between 1954 and 1957, the award was given to the best novel published in Yugoslavia, regardless of the language, but all the novels awarded in this period were written in Serbo-Croatian language. Starting in 1958, only novels written in Serbo-Croatian were eligible. Starting in 2012, only novels written in Serbian were eligible, regardless of the place of publication.

Winners 
Since its inception, the award was not awarded only once, in 1959, when the jury decided that there were no candidates worthy of the award. Oskar Davičo is the only author to have won the award three times (in 1956, 1963 and 1964), and the only one to win it in two consecutive years. The only other authors to have won multiple (two) awards are Dobrica Ćosić, Živojin Pavlović, Dragan Velikić, and most recently Svetislav Basara. So far, seven women have been recipients of the award.

One of the most notable non-recipients is Ivo Andrić, the only Yugoslavian Nobel Prize in Literature laureate. Andrić was candidate for the NIN award once, in 1954, with Prokleta avlija, but the jury disqualified the book as they classified it as a novellete, and not a novel.

Jury members

See also
Isidora Sekulić Award

References

Awards established in 1954
Serbian literary awards
Serbian literature
Yugoslav awards